Bongoyo Island (or simply Bongoyo) is an uninhabited island in Tanzania, situated 2.5 km north of the country's largest city, Dar es Salaam. It is the most frequently visited of the four islands of the Dar es Salaam Marine Reserve (DMRS) and a popular daytrip for both tourists and Tanzanian residents alike for snorkelling and sunbathing.

The island lies close to the Msasani Peninsula (in the Kinondoni district of the city) and is reachable by means of a 30-minute boat ride from the mainland. The point of departure for most visitors to the island is 'The Slipways' hotel complex on the western side of the Msasani Peninsula.

The island has a very rocky shore and only two beaches. All visitors visit the beach at the northwestern tip of the island, where the boats moor and where there are some huts, drinks and food. The much longer but narrower beach along the northeastern side has no facilities and is mostly deserted. The entire island (apart from the beaches) is covered in dense forest and has a few walking trails, so only a few people venture there. The terrain is somewhat treacherous with sharp rocks. The Indian Ocean has penetrated the northern shore of the island, creating a tidal lagoon along whose shores there are some mangroves.

See also
Tanzania Marine Parks and Reserves Unit
List of protected areas of Tanzania

External links

Geography of Dar es Salaam
Uninhabited islands of Tanzania